King William's War (also known as the Second Indian War, Father Baudoin's War, Castin's War, or the First Intercolonial War in French) was the North American theater of the Nine Years' War (1688–1697), also known as the War of the Grand Alliance or the War of the League of Augsburg. It was the first of six colonial wars (see the four French and Indian Wars, Father Rale's War and Father Le Loutre's War) fought between New France and New England along with their respective Native allies before France ceded its remaining mainland territories in North America east of the Mississippi River in 1763.

For King William's War, neither England nor France thought of weakening their position in Europe to support the war effort in North America. New France and the Wabanaki Confederacy were able to thwart New England expansion into Acadia, whose border New France defined as the Kennebec River in southern Maine. According to the terms of the 1697 Peace of Ryswick that ended the Nine Years' War, the boundaries and outposts of New France, New England, and New York remained substantially unchanged.

The war was largely caused by the fact that the treaties and agreements that were reached at the end of King Philip's War (1675–1678) were not adhered to. In addition, the English were alarmed that the Indians were receiving French or maybe Dutch aid. The Indians preyed on the English and their fears, by making it look as though they were with the French. The French were fooled as well, as they thought the Indians were working with the English. These occurrences, in addition to the fact that the English perceived the Indians as their subjects, despite the Indians' unwillingness to submit, eventually led to two conflicts, one of which was King William's War.

North America at the end of the 17th century

The English settlers were more than 154,000 at the beginning of the war, outnumbering the French 12 to 1. However, they were divided in multiple colonies along the Atlantic coast, which were unable to cooperate efficiently, and they were engulfed in the Glorious Revolution, creating tension among the colonists. In addition, the English lacked military leadership and had a difficult relationship with their Iroquois allies.

New France was divided into three entities: Acadia on the Atlantic coast; Canada along the Saint Lawrence River and up to the Great Lakes; and Louisiana from the Great Lakes to the Gulf of Mexico, along the Mississippi River. The French population amounted to 14,000 in 1689. Although the French were vastly outnumbered, they were more politically unified and contained a disproportionate number of adult males with military backgrounds. Realizing their numerical inferiority, they developed good relationships with the indigenous peoples in order to multiply their forces and made effective use of hit-and-run tactics.

Causes of the war

England's Catholic King James II was deposed at the end of 1688 in the Glorious Revolution, after which Protestants William III and Mary II took the throne. William joined the League of Augsburg in its war against France (begun earlier in 1688), where James had fled.

In North America, there was significant tension between New France and the northern English colonies, which had in 1686 been united in the Dominion of New England. New England and the Iroquois Confederacy fought New France and the Wabanaki Confederacy. The Iroquois dominated the economically important Great Lakes fur trade and had been in conflict with New France since 1680. At the urging of New England, the Iroquois interrupted the trade between New France and the western tribes. In retaliation, New France raided Seneca lands of western New York. In turn, New England supported the Iroquois in attacking New France, which they did by raiding Lachine.

There were similar tensions on the border between New England and Acadia, whose boundary New France defined as the Kennebec River in southern Maine. English settlers from Massachusetts (whose charter included the Maine area) had expanded their settlements into Acadia. To secure New France's claim to present-day Maine, New France established Catholic missions among the three largest Indigenous villages in the region: one on the Kennebec River (Norridgewock); one further north on the Penobscot River (Penobscot) and one on the Saint John River (Medoctec). For their part, in response to King Philip's War, the five Indigenous tribes in the region of Acadia created the Wabanaki Confederacy to form a political and military alliance with New France to stop the New England expansion.

Course of war

New England, Acadia and Newfoundland Theatre 
The New England, Acadia and Newfoundland Theatre of the war is also known as Castin's War and Father Jean Baudoin's War.

In April 1688, Governor Andros plundered Castine's home and village on Penobscot Bay (Castine, Maine). Later in August, the English raided the French village of Chedabouctou. In response, Castin and the Wabanaki Confederacy engaged in the Northeast Coast Campaign of 1688 along the New England/Acadia border. They began August 13, 1688, at New Dartmouth (Newcastle), killing a few settlers. A few days later they killed two people at Yarmouth in the first battle. At Kennebunk, in the autumn of 1688, members of the Confederacy killed two families.

The following spring, in June 1689, several hundred Abenaki and Pennacook Indians under the command of Kancamagus and Mesandowit raided Dover, New Hampshire, killing more than 20 and taking 29 captives, who were sold into captivity in New France. In June, they killed four men at Saco. In response to these raids, a company of 24 men was raised to search for the bodies and pursue the natives. They were forced to return after they lost a quarter of their men in conflicts with the natives.

In August 1689, Jean-Vincent d'Abbadie de Saint-Castin and Father Louis-Pierre Thury led an Abenaki war party that captured and destroyed the fort at Pemaquid (in present-day Bristol, Maine). The fall of Pemaquid was a significant setback to the English. It pushed the frontier back to Casco (Falmouth), Maine.

New England retaliated for these raids by sending Major Benjamin Church to raid Acadia. During King William's War, Church led four New England raiding parties into Acadia (which included most of Maine) against the Acadians and members of the Wabanaki Confederacy. On the first expedition into Acadia, on September 21, 1689, Church and 250 troops defended a group of English settlers trying to establish themselves at Falmouth (near present-day Portland, Maine). The tribes of the Wabanaki Confederacy killed 21 of his men, but Church's defense was successful and the natives retreated. Church then returned to Boston, leaving the small group of English settlers unprotected. The following spring over 400 French and native troops, under the leadership of Castin, destroyed Salmon Falls (present-day Berwick, Maine), then returned to Falmouth and massacred all the English settlers in the Battle of Fort Loyal. When Church returned to the village later that summer he buried the dead. The fall of Fort Loyal (Casco) led to the near depopulation of Maine. Native forces were then able to attack New Hampshire frontier without reprisal.

Battle of Port Royal (1690)

The New Englanders, led by Sir William Phips, retaliated by attacking Port Royal, the capital of Acadia. The Battle of Port Royal began on May 9, 1690. Phips arrived with 736 New England men in seven English ships. Governor de Meneval fought for two days and then capitulated. The garrison was imprisoned in the church, and Governor de Meneval was confined to his house. The New Englanders levelled what was begun of the new fort. The residents of Port Royal were imprisoned in the church and administered an oath of allegiance to the King.

Phips left, but warships from New York City arrived in June, which resulted in more destruction. The seamen burned and looted the settlement, including the parish church. The New Englanders left again, and Villebon, the governor of Acadia, moved the capital to safer territory inland at Fort Nashwaak (present-day Fredericton, New Brunswick). Fort Nashwaak remained the capital until after the war, when Port Royal was restored as the capital in 1699.

In Church's second expedition to Acadia, he arrived with 300 men at Casco Bay on 11 September 1690. His mission was to relieve the English Fort Pejpescot (present-day Brunswick, Maine), which had been taken by the Wabanaki Confederacy. He went up the Androscoggin River to Fort Pejepscot. From there he went  upriver to Livermore Falls and attacked a native village. Church's men shot three or four native men when they were retreating. Church discovered five English captives in the wigwams. Church butchered six or seven natives and took nine prisoners. A few days later, in retaliation, the members of the Wabanaki Confederacy attacked Church at Cape Elizabeth on Purpooduc Point, killing seven of his men and wounding 24 others. On September 26, Church returned to Portsmouth, New Hampshire.

During King William's War, when the town of Wells contained about 80 houses and log cabins strung along the Post Road, it was attacked on June 9, 1691, by about 200 Native Americans commanded by the sachem Moxus. But Captain James Converse and his militia successfully defended Lieutenant Joseph Storer's garrison, which was surrounded by a gated palisade. Another sachem, Madockawando, threatened to return the next year "and have the dog Converse out of his den".

As the natives withdrew, they went to York off Cape Neddick and boarded a vessel, killing most of the crew. They also burned a hamlet.

In early 1692, an estimated 150 Abenakis commanded by officers of New France returned to York, killing about 100 of the English settlers and burning down buildings in what would become known as the Candlemas Massacre.

Church's third expedition to Acadia during the war was in 1692 when he raided Penobscot (present-day Indian Island, Maine) with 450 men. Church and his men then went on to raid Taconock (Winslow, Maine).

In 1693, New England frigates attacked Port Royal again, burning almost a dozen houses and three barns full of grain.

On July 18, 1694, French soldier Claude-Sébastien de Villieu with about 250 Abenakis from Norridgewock under command of their sagamore (paramount chief) Bomazeen (or Bomoseen) raided the English settlement of Durham, New Hampshire, in the Oyster River Massacre. In all, the French and native force killed 104 inhabitants and took 27 captive, burning half the dwellings, including five garrisons. They also destroyed crops and killed livestock, causing famine and destitution for the survivors.

Siege of Pemaquid (1696) 

In 1696, New France and the tribes of the Wabanaki Confederacy, led by St. Castine and Pierre Le Moyne d'Iberville, returned and fought a naval battle in the Bay of Fundy before moving on to raid Pemaquid. After the Siege of Pemaquid, d'Iberville led a force of 124 Canadians, Acadians, Mi'kmaq and Abenakis in the Avalon Peninsula Campaign. They destroyed almost every English settlement in Newfoundland, over 100 English were killed, many times that number captured, and almost 500 deported to England or France.

In retaliation, Church went on his fourth expedition to Acadia and carried out a retaliatory raid against Acadian communities on the Isthmus of Chignecto and Fort Nashwack (present-day Fredericton, New Brunswick), which was then the capital of Acadia. He led his troops personally in killing inhabitants of Chignecto, looting their household goods, burning their houses and slaughtering the livestock.

Quebec and New York Theatre 
Also in August 1689, 1,500 Iroquois, seeking revenge for Governor General Denonville's actions, attacked the French settlement at Lachine. Count Frontenac, who replaced Denonville as governor general, later attacked the Iroquois village of Onondaga. New France and its Indian allies then attacked English frontier settlements in early 1690, most notably at Schenectady in New York.

This was followed by two expeditions. One, on land under Connecticut provincial militia general Fitz-John Winthrop, targeted Montreal; the other, led by Sir William Phips, targeted Quebec. Winthrop's expedition failed due to disease and supply issues, and Phips was defeated in the Battle of Quebec. The Quebec and Port Royal expeditions were the only major New England offensives of King William's War; for the remainder of the war the English colonists were primarily engaged in defensive operations, skirmishes and retaliatory raids.

The Iroquois Five Nations suffered from the weakness of their English allies. In 1693 and 1696, the French and their Indian allies ravaged Iroquois towns and destroyed crops while New York colonists remained passive. After the English and French made peace in 1697, the Iroquois, now abandoned by the English colonists, remained at war with New France until 1701, when a peace was agreed at Montreal between New France and a large number of Iroquois and other tribes.

Hudson Bay Theatre 

The war also served as a backdrop for an ongoing economic war between French and English interests in Arctic North America. The Hudson's Bay Company had established trading outposts on James Bay and the southern reaches of Hudson Bay by the early 1680s. In a series of raids, beginning with the so-called Hudson Bay expedition, organized by Governor Denonville and continuing through the time of the Nine Years' War (1688-1697), most of these outposts, including Moose Factory, York Factory and Fort Albany, were taken by French raiders, primarily led by Pierre Le Moyne d'Iberville.

But the French forces were small, and their hold on the captured posts quite weak—York Factory was recaptured by the English in 1695. In 1697, in the Battle of Hudson's Bay, one of the war's major naval battles, d'Iberville, with a single ship, defeated three English ships and went on to again capture York Factory.

Aftermath
The Treaty of Ryswick signed in September 1697 ended the war between the two colonial powers, reverting the colonial borders to the status quo ante bellum. The peace did not last long; and within five years, the colonies were embroiled in the next phase of the colonial wars, Queen Anne's War. After their settlement with France in 1701, the Iroquois remained neutral in that conflict, never taking part in active hostilities against either side.  Tensions remained high between the English and the tribes of the Wabanaki Confederacy, who again fought with the French in Queen Anne's War, with conflict characterized by frequent raids in Massachusetts, including one on Groton in 1694, in which children were kidnapped, and the Deerfield Massacre in 1704, in which more than 100 captives were taken north to Montreal for ransom or adoption by Mohawk and French.  By the end of the war, natives were successful in killing more than 700 English and capturing over 250 along the Acadia/ New England border.

The Ryswick treaty was unsatisfactory to representatives of the Hudson's Bay Company. Since most of its trading posts in Hudson Bay had been lost to the French before the war began, the rule of status quo ante bellum meant that they remained under French control. The company recovered its territories at the negotiating table when the Treaty of Utrecht ended Queen Anne's War.

Scholars debate whether the war was a contributing factor to the Salem witch trials. King William's War as well as King Philip's War (1675–78) led to the displacement of many refugees in Essex County. The refugees carried with them fears of the Indians, which is debated to have led to fears of witchcraft, especially since the devil was arguably closely associated with Indians and magic. Of course, Cotton Mather also wrote that it was going to lead to an age of sorrow and is arguably a proponent in leading Salem into the witchcraft crisis of 1692. Scholars debate this theory and one scholar, Jenny Hale Pulsipher, maintains that King William's War was more of a cause. Other scholars that have written on the theory of the wars being a leading cause of the Salem Witchcraft Trials include Mary Beth Norton, James Kences, and Emerson Baker.

See also
Colonial American military history
Military history of Canada
Military history of Nova Scotia
Military history of England
Military history of France

Notes

Citations

References

External links

 
 King William's War (1689–1697) at usahistory.info

 
+
Military history of Acadia
Military history of New England
Military history of the Thirteen Colonies
Colonization history of the United States
Colonial American and Indian wars
Conflicts in New Brunswick
Conflicts in Nova Scotia
Colonial United States (British)
Colonial United States (French)
17th-century conflicts
Anglo-French wars
Wabanaki Confederacy
Indigenous conflicts in Canada
17th-century military history of the Kingdom of England
1680s in North America
1690s in North America
17th century in North America
History of New France
1688 in North America
1697 in North America
17th century in New France
1688 in New France
1697 in New France
William III of England
Wars of succession involving the states and peoples of Europe
Wars of succession involving the states and peoples of North America